White Dominicans or European Dominicans, are Dominicans whose ancestry lies within the continent of Europe.

As of 2013, people of solely European descent are a small minority in the Commonwealth of Dominica, comprising only 0.8% of the population.

Most White Dominicans are descendants of European settlers of French and English stock.

History

Christopher Columbus landed in Dominica in November 1493. Spanish ships frequently landed on Dominica during the 16th century, but fierce resistance by the indigenous Caribs discouraged Spain’s efforts at settlement in the island. In 1635, France officially claimed Dominica. Dominica was colonized by the Spanish, French and English. The first Europeans colonists in Dominica were the French.

Notable people

Henry Alfred Alford Nicholls (1851–1926), physician
Jean Rhys (1890–1970), novelist
Elma Napier (1892–1973), writer and politician
Phyllis Shand Allfrey (1908–1986), writer and social activist
Gary di Silvestri (born 1967), cross-country skier
Angelica di Silvestri (born 1965), cross-country skier
Steve Agar (born 1968), track and field athlete

See also
 Afro-Dominican (Dominica)

References and footnotes

 
Dominica
Ethnic groups in Dominica
White Caribbean